Brookston can refer to a place in the United States:
 Brookston, Indiana
 Brookston, Minnesota
 Brookston, Texas